Paul Carr (born 13 May 1967) is a former professional rugby league footballer who played in the 1990s.

Playing career

International honours
Paul Carr won a cap for Scotland while at Sheffield Eagles in 1997 against France.

Challenge Cup Final appearances
Paul Carr played  in Sheffield Eagles' 17-8 victory over Wigan in the 1998 Challenge Cup Final during Super League III at Wembley Stadium, London on Saturday 2 May 1998

References

External links

1967 births
Australian people of Scottish descent
Hunslet R.L.F.C. players
Living people
Place of birth missing (living people)
Scotland national rugby league team players
Sheffield Eagles (1984) players
South Sydney Rabbitohs players
Rugby league second-rows